Richard Bateman (29 April 1849 – 5 November 1913) was an English first-class cricketer. Bateman's batting style is unknown. He was born at Farnham, Surrey.

Bateman made a single first-class appearance for Hampshire against Somerset in 1883 at the County Ground, Taunton. He was dismissed for 4 in Hampshire's first-innings by Alfred Evans and ended their second-innings not out on 14. Somerset won the match by 5 wickets, in what was Bateman's only first-class appearance.

He died at Ash Vale, Surrey on 5 November 1913.

References

External links
Richard Bateman at ESPNcricinfo
Richard Bateman at CricketArchive

1849 births
1913 deaths
People from Farnham
English cricketers
Hampshire cricketers